"Miners" is a poem by Wilfred Owen. He wrote the poem in Scarborough in January 1918, a few weeks after leaving Craiglockhart War Hospital where he had been recovering from shell-shock. Owen wrote the poem in direct response to the Minnie Pit Disaster in which 156 people (155 miners, 1 rescue worker) died.

Background 
After his discharge from Craiglockhart and a short spell of leave, Owen rejoined his army unit (the 3/5th battalion the Manchester Regiment) in Scarborough. While his men were in stationed at Burniston Road Barracks a mile north-west of the town, Owen and other officers were billeted in the Clarence Gardens (now the Clifton) Hotel; Owen was the mess secretary. Owen had a unique room in the hotel: he occupied the five-windowed turret on the 5th floor, directly overlooking the sea.

He wrote Miners in under an hour in response to the Minnie Pit Disaster of 12 January 1918, in which 156 men and boys lost their lives as a result of a firedamp explosion, including 40 pit-lads under 16. Owen was unusually well-acquainted (for someone with a grammar school education) with working-class miner types. Aged nineteen, he had met a Northumberland pit-lad who made a particular impression on him at a nonconformist convention in Keswick in 1912. Also, many of the men in his platoon had worked down the Lancashire pits before the war: in 1916, Owen had described his men as"hard-handed, hard-headed miners, dogged, loutish, ugly. (But I would trust them to advance under fire and to hold their trench;) blond, coarse, ungainly, strong, 'unfatiguable', unlovely, Lancashire soldiers, Saxons to the bone. In addition, Owen was a keen geologist who had collected rocks and minerals since his youth, and in Miners he uses phrases like "smothered ferns" and "frond-forests", redolent of the imprints of fossil plants in coal.

Poem 
The opening stanzas evoke the poet gazing into the fire imagining a primeval forest older than myth, "before the fauns". But his traumatic experiences on the Western Front intrude on his somewhat romantic meditation: "Wrote a poem on the Colliery Disaster: but I get mixed up with the War at the end. It is short, but oh! sour." The gently hissing coals recall the moans of the dying miners "writhing for air"; Owen intertwines their deaths with those of soldiers at the front, imagining charred bodies reduced to ash. Owen laments that though people over the coming years will live on peacefully and doze by fires, their coals will have been formed of the toils of the dead soldiers and miners, now buried under the earth and forgotten.

For a projected volume of his work, Owen gave the poem the subtitle: How the future will forget the dead in war.

Publication 
Owen sent the poem to The Nation in the evening of the day he finished it. The proofs arrived while Owen was preparing to attend Robert Graves' wedding (on 23 January at St. James's Church, Piccadilly).

Miners was published on 26 January 1918, one of only five poems by Owen published in his lifetime. The cheque arrived on 14 February. Owen, in one of his many letters to his mother, said he was "satisfied with the Two Guineas that half-hour's work brought me."

Notes

References

Sources

External links 
 Clifton Hotel, Scarborough for sale, 2011
 Miners at the Wilfred Owen Association
 Miners:autograph manuscript and full text at Oxford University First World War poetry archive

Poetry by Wilfred Owen
1918 poems
British poems
World War I poems